Donewell Yobe (born 24 August 1983) is a Zambian former footballer who played as a striker.

Career
Yobe played club football in both Zambia and Finland, appearing for Lusaka Dynamos, ZESCO United and AC Oulu. While signed to AC Oulu, Yobe was convicted of match-fixing, alongside brother Dominic.

Yobe also earned one international cap for Zambia in 2006.

References

1983 births
Living people
Zambian footballers
Zambia international footballers
Lusaka Dynamos F.C. players
ZESCO United F.C. players
AC Oulu players
Ykkönen players
Veikkausliiga players
Association football forwards
Zambian expatriate footballers
Zambian expatriate sportspeople in Finland
Expatriate footballers in Finland